The 2023 Supercopa de Chile (known as the Supercopa Easy 2023 for sponsorship purposes) was the eleventh edition of the Supercopa de Chile, competition organised by the Asociación Nacional de Fútbol Profesional (ANFP). The match was played by the 2022 Chilean Primera División champions Colo-Colo and the 2022 Copa Chile champions Magallanes on 15 January 2023 at Estadio Sausalito in Viña del Mar.

Magallanes won their first Supercopa title, beating Colo-Colo 4–3 on penalties after a 1–1 draw over 90 minutes.

Teams
The two teams that contested the Supercopa are Colo-Colo, who qualified as 2022 Primera División champions and Magallanes, who qualified for the match as 2022 Copa Chile champions, defeating Unión Española in the final on penalty kicks after a 2–2 draw.

Details

References

S